Rana pueyoi is an extinct species of large frog from Early Miocene of Spain.

References
 Amphibian (DK Eyewitness Books) by Barry Clarke and Laura Buller (page 9)
 Fossils (Expert Guides) by Brenda Lewis, Paula Hammond, and Carl Mehling (page 257)

Miocene amphibians
Prehistoric amphibians of Europe
Fossil taxa described in 1922